Khaleda Rabbani is a Bangladesh Nationalist Party politician and the former Member of the Bangladesh Parliament from a reserved seat.

Career
Rabbani was elected to parliament from reserved seat as a Bangladesh Nationalist Party candidate in 2005.

References

Bangladesh Nationalist Party politicians
Living people
Women members of the Jatiya Sangsad
8th Jatiya Sangsad members
Year of birth missing (living people)
2nd Jatiya Sangsad members
20th-century Bangladeshi women politicians
21st-century Bangladeshi women politicians